The 2014 Adelaide United FC W-League season was the club's seventh participation in the W-League, since the league's formation in 2008.

Players

Squad information

Transfers in

Transfers out

Technical staff

Competitions

W-League

League table

Results summary

Results by round

Goal scorers

Matches

References

External links
 Official Website

Adelaide United FC (A-League Women) seasons
Adelaide United